Ben Eaves (born 10 April 1987) is a former professional basketball player.

Pre-Professional Career
Eaves played a post-graduate year in the United States at Worcester Academy. Following his post-graduate experience, he played one season with the University of Connecticut before transferring to the University of Rhode Island. Playing three seasons with the Rams, Eaves would finish his senior year averaging 3.1 points and 2.5 rebounds in 12.4 minutes.

Professional career
Eaves started his professional career in 2011 with Cypriot team APOEL.

International
Eaves has represented Great Britain at U20 and U23 level.

References

1987 births
Living people
APOEL B.C. players
British expatriate basketball people in the United States
English men's basketball players
Power forwards (basketball)
Rhode Island Rams men's basketball players
Small forwards
UConn Huskies men's basketball players
Worcester Academy alumni
British expatriate basketball people in Cyprus
English expatriate sportspeople in the United States
English expatriate sportspeople in Cyprus
Sportspeople from Preston, Lancashire